Arylacetamide deacetylase is an enzyme that in humans is encoded by the AADAC gene.

Microsomal arylacetamide deacetylase competes against the activity of cytosolic arylamine N-acetyltransferase, which catalyzes one of the initial biotransformation pathways for arylamine and heterocyclic amine carcinogens.

References

Further reading

External links